is a Japanese author and game designer. Mizuno created Record of Lodoss War, Sword World RPG, Legend of Crystania, Rune Soldier,  Starship Operators, Record of Grancrest War, and was the general supervisor of Galaxy Angel.

References

External links 
 
 
 Ryo Mizuno manga at Media Arts Database 
 Ryo Mizuno anime at Media Arts Database 

1963 births
Living people
Japanese writers